Klevtsovskaya is a rural locality (a village) in Zaborskoye Rural Settlement, Tarnogsky District, Vologda Oblast, Russia. The population was 19 as of 2002.

Geography 
Klevtsovskaya is located 28 km southwest of Tarnogsky Gorodok (the district's administrative centre) by road. Alferovskaya is the nearest rural locality.

References 

Rural localities in Tarnogsky District